Eckart Suhl (sometimes spelled Eckardt Suhl; born 20 April 1943 in Hamburg) is a former field hockey player from Germany, who was a member of the West-German team that won the golden medal at the 1972 Summer Olympics in Munich.

References

External links
 

1943 births
Living people
German male field hockey players
Olympic field hockey players of West Germany
Field hockey players at the 1972 Summer Olympics
Olympic medalists in field hockey
Medalists at the 1972 Summer Olympics
Field hockey players at the 1968 Summer Olympics
Olympic gold medalists for West Germany
20th-century German people